Oy Woikoski Ab is Finland's oldest industrial and medical gas supplier. The company started 1882 as a carbon black factory which then evolved into the company's current form. The company is also an importer of welding and gas equipment which they distribute along with their gas products through a network of resellers. Kt currently operates 13 plants and offices, and has over 200 agents in Finland. Their annual turnover is approx. 25 million EUR.

Woikoski is also an exporter of liquid and gaseous helium, with an automated helium plant capable of recycling gaseous helium. In 2006 the company finished a carbon dioxide treatment plant capable of recovering and recycling 1-3 tonnes of carbon dioxide per hour.

References

Chemical companies of Finland